Plataplochilus is a genus of poeciliid fishes native to Middle Africa.

Species
There are currently six recognized species in this genus:
 Plataplochilus cabindae (Boulenger, 1911)
 Plataplochilus chalcopyrus J. G. Lambert, 1963 (Flame lampeye)
 Plataplochilus loemensis (Pellegrin, 1924) (Loeme lampeye)
 Plataplochilus miltotaenia J. G. Lambert, 1963 (Red striped lampeye)
 Plataplochilus ngaensis (C. G. E. Ahl, 1924) (Nga lampeye)
 Plataplochilus terveri (Huber, 1981) (Terver's lampeye)

References

Poeciliidae
Fish of Africa
Freshwater fish genera
Taxa named by Ernst Ahl
Ray-finned fish genera